Konstantinos Asopios was a Greek scholar and academic teacher of the 19th century from Epirus.

Biography

Konstantinos Asopios was born in Grammeno near Ioannina around 1790. He was a child of a poor family and initially had the surname Dsolbas. After the death of his father, he followed his mother in Ioannina, where she had found work in the Melas family house. Thanks to his good performance at school he received a scholarship by the benefactor Zois Kaplanis. Later, he was given the surname “Asopios” by the school principal, Athanasios Psalidas, which he adopted.

Alongside his studies, he worked as a private teacher and he use the amount of money he collected to go, along with Christoforos Filitas, in Italy (Naples) to study medicine, but a health problem forced him to go to Corfu in 1813 in order to regain health. After his recovery, he returned to Italy and specifically in Venice, where he worked as a translator. Later, he moved to Trieste where he worked for five years as a teacher in the Greek school of the city. After that, he studied at the universities of Göttingen, Berlin and Paris at Lord Guilford’s expenses, who knew him from Ioannina, in order to become a professor of the Ionian Academy that the English nobleman intended to found, which he did in 1824.

After the death of Lord Guilford and the decline of the Ionian Academy that followed, Asopios accepted the proposal of the Greek state and he got a job at the University of Athens, where he served as a dean three times. He retired in 1866 due to a serious health problem and died a few years later, on 19 November 1872. A big crowd attended his funeral.

He was married to Eleni Asimakopoulou, whom he met during his stay in Trieste. They had two children, Irinaios and Evridiki.

References

Bibliography
Anastasios N. Goudas (1874). Βίοι Παράλληλοι των επί της Αναγεννήσεως της Ελλάδος Διαπρεψάντων Ανδρών, τ. Β'. Αθήνησι: Τύποις Χ. Ν. Φιλαδελφέως.

1790 births
1872 deaths
People from Ioannina (regional unit)
Greeks from the Ottoman Empire
Greek scholars
Academic staff of the National and Kapodistrian University of Athens